Sukha Dukhalu (Bittersweet) is a 1968 Indian Telugu-language drama film directed by I. N. Murthy. It is an adaptation of K. Balachander's Tamil play Major Chandrakanth. The film stars Vanisri, Jayalalitha, Ramkrishna and Chandra Mohan, with S. V. Ranga Rao and Haranath in supporting roles. It was released on 4 January 1968.

Plot

Cast 
 Jayalalithaa
 Vanisri
 Chandra Mohan
 Rama Krishna
 S. V. Ranga Rao
 Haranath
 Ramana Reddy
 Suryakantham
 Saradhi
 Maddali
 B KoteswaraRao

Soundtrack 
The music was composed by S. P. Kodandapani. The songs "Idi Mallela Velayani" and "Medante Meda Kadu" are famous songs till date. The latter was one of the first notable hits of S. P. Balasubrahmanyam in Telugu cinema.
 - P Susheela
 - SP Balu – Devulapalli
 - P Susheela, SP Balu
 - P Susheela, Ghantasala

Reception

References

External links 
 

1960s Telugu-language films
1968 drama films
1968 films
Indian drama films
Indian films based on plays